The name Olga has been used for sixteen tropical cyclones worldwide: three in the Atlantic Ocean (where it replaced the name Opal), ten in the Western Pacific Ocean, and three in the Australian region in Southern Hemisphere.

In the Atlantic:
Hurricane Olga (2001) – large Category 1 hurricane that had no effect on land.
Tropical Storm Olga (2007) – off-season storm that killed 40 people, mostly in the Dominican Republic.
Tropical Storm Olga (2019) – formed in the Gulf of Mexico and became post-tropical shortly thereafter.

In the Western Pacific:
Tropical Storm Olga (1948) (T4827)
Typhoon Olga (1954) (T5417)
Typhoon Olga (1958) (T5830)
Typhoon Olga (1961) (T6119, 51W)
Tropical Storm Olga (1964) (22W) – formed and remained in the Gulf of Tonkin.
Tropical Storm Olga (1966) (T6634, 37W)
Typhoon Olga (1970) (T7002, 02W, Deling) – affected Japan.
Typhoon Olga (1972) (T7226, 28W) – struck the Marshall Islands and the Northern Marianas, causing minimal damage.
Typhoon Olga (1976) (T7605, 05W, Didang) – affected the Philippines and Japan.
Typhoon Olga (1999) (T9907, 11W, Ising) – killed 106 people in North and South Korea and caused US$657 million in damages.

In the Australian region:
Tropical Cyclone Olga (1981)
Tropical Cyclone Olga (2000) –  paralleled the Kimberley and Pilbara coasts
Tropical Cyclone Olga (2010) – crossed the lower Cape York Peninsula and then meandered in the southern Gulf of Carpentaria.

Atlantic hurricane set index articles
Pacific typhoon set index articles
Australian region cyclone set index articles